Daraga station is a railway station located on the South Main Line in Albay, Philippines.

History
Daraga was opened on November 1914 as part of the Legazpi Division Line from Tabaco, Albay to Iriga, Camarines Sur via Legazpi City. The station was expanded in 1938 for the completion of the Manila-Legazpi Line.

The station building was reconstructed and reopened on September 18, 2015 to serve the Bicol Commuter trains to and from Legazpi.

References

Philippine National Railways stations
Railway stations in Albay